Decatoca is a genus of flowering plants belonging to the family Ericaceae.

Its native range is New Guinea.

Species:
 Decatoca spenceri F.Muell.

References

Epacridoideae
Ericaceae genera